London Elects is the Greater London Authority (GLA) team responsible for organising the election of the Mayor of London and the London Assembly. The London Elects team report to the Greater London Returning Officer.

Operations

The team responsibilities include: 
working closely with electoral staff in the 32 London boroughs and the City of London to provide training and support for polling station staff and to make sure everyone is well prepared for the election and the count
managing candidate nominations for the Mayoral election and the London-wide list
organising arrangements for the count
managing the three count centres and the contract with the company providing electronic counting
working with the Government on budget and legal issues
an advertising campaign
the London Elects website
the statutory mayoral address booklet, comprising ‘mini-manifestos’ from mayoral candidates, delivered to all London's voters.

History
Following the 1999 GLA Act, the first London Mayoral and London Assembly elections were held in 2000. Subsequent elections were held in 2004, 2008, 2012, 2016 and 2021 (having been delayed from 2020 on health grounds).

See also
Electoral Commission (United Kingdom)
Mayor of London
London Assembly
Greater London Authority

References

External links
London Elects Official website
The Electoral Commission website
GLA official website

Local government in London